Frederick 'Freddie' Gerard Owen (born 25 September 1985) is an English former first-class cricketer.

Owen was born at Chester in September 1985. He was educated at King's School, Chester before going up to Corpus Christi College, Cambridge. While studying at Cambridge, he played first-class cricket for Cambridge University from 2006–10, making four appearances against Oxford University in The University Match. He scored 116 runs in his four matches against Oxford, averaging 16.57 and making a high score of 42. In addition to playing for Cambridge University, he also made a single first-class appearance for Cambridge UCCE against Warwickshire at Fenner's in 2008, recording a half century in the match with a score of exactly 50.

Notes and references

External links

1985 births
Living people
People from Chester
People educated at The King's School, Chester
Alumni of Corpus Christi College, Cambridge
English cricketers
Cambridge University cricketers
Cambridge MCCU cricketers